is a passenger railway station located in the city of Ushiku, Ibaraki Prefecture, Japan operated by the East Japan Railway Company (JR East).

Lines
Hitachino-Ushiku Station is served by the Jōban Line, and is located 54.5 km from the official starting point of the line at Nippori Station.

Station layout
The station consists of two island platforms connected to the station building by a footbridge. The station has a Midori no Madoguchi staffed ticket office.

Platforms

History

Passenger statistics
In fiscal 2019, the station was used by an average of 6952 passengers daily (boarding passengers only).

Surrounding area
 
Hitachino-Ushiku Post Office

See also
 List of railway stations in Japan

References

External links

  Station information JR East Station Information 

Railway stations in Ibaraki Prefecture
Jōban Line
Railway stations in Japan opened in 1998